Return to Ithaca is a 1946 novel by Swedish author Eyvind Johnson. It is based on the story of Odysseus as he returns home to Ithaca after the Trojan War.

The plot recounts the events surrounding the Greek hero Odysseus, his journey home from the Trojan War, his wife Penelope's waiting for him and his son Telemachos's eagerness to meet his father. The novel is counted among the great classics of Swedish literature. In the SVT program Babel it was named in 2013 as one of only five books that should be part of a Swedish literary canon. It has been published in many editions and translated into some twenty languages.

Plot 

Odysseus is ruler of the island of Ithaca. Nineteen years earlier, he left his wife Penelope and his son Telemachus to join the Greek forces attacking Troy. The war went on for ten years, and on the way home Odysseus was delayed by many mishaps. He fetches up on an island where a woman named Calypso lives and stays there for seven years. In Ithaca, Penelope hesitates to remarry. She is courted by a large number of suitors whom she puts off by saying that she cannot make a decision until she has finished weaving a bedspread for her father-in-law. She weaves every day, but unpicks most of the weaving again at night. At the same time, Telemachus has begun to find out about his father. Odysseus is visited by the messenger of the gods, Hermes, who orders him to return home. Reluctantly, Odysseus sets off to sail to Ithaca, but is shipwrecked and washed ashore on a coast ruled by Alkinoos. His daughter Nausikaa who discovers Odysseus and brings him to the king's court. After Odysseus's poignant account of his adventures, he sails back to Ithaca. Disguised as a beggar, he arrives on the island; he meets the swineherd Eumaios who persuades him that he must deal with his wife's suitors and kill them.

Narrative style 

Return to Ithaca is based on Homer's The Odyssey, but differs from the original, in  view, in that Johnson has added a psychological dimension where the main characters' thoughts and doubts are depicted, among other things through inner monologues. The story alludes to contemporary times and the experiences of the Second World War. The novel has an ingeniously executed composition consisting of three simultaneous narratives. The first has Odysseus as the protagonist, the second centres around Penelope and the third revolves around Telemachus. The events in these three threads partially interfere with each other and finally run together. With the narrative approach, Johnson strove for a sense of simultaneity in these events and an opportunity to see the whole of reality at once, with all its complications. This was a narrative style that Johnson would later develop further in his novels.

Reception

Contemporary 

The book was published in the late autumn of 1946. It was greeted with some hostility by homerologists, who objected to the amount of modern naturalistic scene description, and the anti-heroic presentation. On the other hand, it was warmly received by Sweden's leading critics. Sten Selander in Svenska Dagbladet wrote that "Nowhere has Eyvind Johnson's storytelling gift been given freer rein than here; and never before has he given more convincing proof that he is the only genius among the prose writers of his generation."  Anders Österling in Stockholms-Tidningen spoke of "a significant work, without any question one of the boldest approaches in our new art of storytelling".  Karl Vennberg in  found that the author had set out and almost succeeded in a paradoxical task: "The elevated must remain elevated but still be lowered to an everyday plane; the supernatural must be connected to a chain of cause and effect without ceasing to be impenetrable and marvellous; the timeless must be coloured by the present without losing its character of timelessness."  Vennberg also praised the style, the joy of storytelling, the portrayal of people and above all the moral exploration. 

Outside Sweden, Philip Burnham in The New York Times wrote that "If Homer makes the Trojan Expedition the greatest and most heroic war of history, Eyvind Johnson makes the decade following, when Odysseus was wandering home, an almost proportionate post-war depression."

Modern 

In 1981, Merete Mazzarella's book Myt och verklighet. Berättandets problem i Eyvind Johnsons roman 'Strändernas svall examined in detail Johnson's treatment of the homeric myth of Odysseus. She explores Johnson's recurring theme of escape and return home, seeking to demonstrate how the fictional narrator has to escape from subjective experience using myth, so as to share his vision with his readers. What is lived is never the same as what is evoked; Mazzarella describes this as a tension between the described reality and the escaped. To make the case for this "dynamic tension", she analyses the importance of the Odysseus myth to Johnson's writing; Johnson's own statements about myth and reality in his writing; and twentieth century views of myth by writers such as the folklorist James George Frazer, the psychoanalysts Sigmund Freud and Carl Jung, and the novelist Thomas Mann, all of whom influenced Johnson. Johnson's Odysseus is presented as Frazer's mythical archetype of the fated hero, but also a self-consciously Freudian figure full of memories, dreams, and reflections. In Monica Setterwall's view, the core of Mazzarella's thesis is the way the narrators - both the explicit narrator, and Odysseus himself as he tells his tale to the Phaeacians - help to unpick the issue of violence, ending with Odysseus's killing of Penelope's suitors. Odysseus makes his experiences into a myth, while the narrator breaks up the myth, necessarily making Odysseus an anti-hero, to discover the ancient reality that applies in modern times. Among the ironies and the illusions of heroism are that Odysseus went to war to protect Ithaca, but that he comes home bringing violence to re-establish peace and order. Mazzarella links this to Johnson's post-Second World War Sweden, and suggests a humanistic resolution as Telemachos reacts to Nestor's cup, a symbol of both grief and longing.

More recently, Elisabeth Nordgren, writing in Lysmasken, describes the book as setting the Odysseus figure into modern time, its subtitle "A novel about present time" emphasising its contemporary focus. She states that Johnson takes off Odysseus's heroic halo and lets him be a reflective person who feels divided and unsure. Published just after the Second World War, Johnson has made Odysseus a tired warrior who just wants to go home and live in peace. Nordgren writes that the novel describes Odysseus's dizzying, wandering, adventurous homeward journey, meeting nymphs and monsters, and his wife Penelope's long wait on Ithaca. She calls the novel's structure interesting, with its simultaneous and parallel events in somewhat mythic style, a "metafiction" and a narrative in Johnson's own time. As such it is a rewarding book, and an excellent way in, in Nordgren's opinion, to Johnson's novels.

Cyrille François, in Revue de Littérature Comparée, examines Johnson's treatment of Odysseus's deceitfulness, comparing it with Jean Giono's Naissance de l’Odyssée on the same subject.

Adaptations 

In 1948 a reworked theatre version Strändernas svall: ett drama i tre akter och ett antal bilder om den återvändande was published.

References

Sources

 
 

1946 Swedish novels
Swedish-language novels
Novels by Eyvind Johnson